Boyde is a surname. Notable people with the surname include:

 Andreas Boyde (born  1967), German pianist
 James Boyde (born 1943), Canadian biathlete
 Thomas Wilson Boyde Jr. (1905–1981), American architect
 William Boyde (born 1953), British actor

See also
 Bode (disambiguation)
 Boyd (disambiguation)
 Boye (disambiguation)
 Boid
 Loyde